Best Wishes is the second album by the New York hardcore band Cro-Mags. It was released on April 26, 1989 via Profile Records and was subsequently re-released via Another Planet – along with the band's debut album, The Age of Quarrel, on the same disc.

The album's cover reflected the band's interest in the Hare Krishna religion which started with previous singer John Joseph and then carried on through Harley Flanagan who also became a devotee. Their next album, Alpha Omega, saw the return of John Joseph to the Cro-Mags fold, and an even further gravitation towards a metal sound.

Overview 
After the short, sharp bursts of song encountered on their previous album, 1986's The Age of Quarrel, this album saw a complete change of style as Cro-Mags entered the crossover thrash and thrash metal arena, complete with guitar solos. The songs also became longer – averaging around four minutes, whereas over half of Quarrel's songs came in under the two-minute mark. There were two line-up changes from the previous album – most notably, John Joseph's departure paved the way for Harley Flanagan to take up both bass and vocal duties. According to guitarist Parris Mayhew: 

Flanagan's was a very different vocal style and it further juxtaposed the band's image from straightout hardcore punk to a more metal sound. Another change was Pete Hines coming in on drums.

Release and reception 

In an AllMusic review, Alex Henderson said: 

Writing for The Pensive Quill, Christopher Owens summed the record up as "...a perfect example of crossover done correctly. It's heavy enough to appeal to the hi-tops brigade, but still retains the aggression and intensity of hardcore."

Track listing

Personnel 
Cro-Mags
 Harley Flanagan – bass, vocals
 Parris Mitchell Mayhew  – guitar
 Doug Holland – guitar
 Pete Hines – drums

Production
 Recorded in 1988–1989 at Normandy Sound, Warren, Rhode Island
 Produced by Chris Williamson
 Engineered by Tom Soares
 Assistant engineered by Jamie Locke
 Mixed by Chris Williamson and Tom Soares
 Further assistance by Robert Windsor
 Original cover illustration by The Bhaktivedanta Book Trust

Additional production
 Reissue remastered by Alan Douches at West Westside Music

References

External links 
  Official Cro-mags website
 Parris Mayhew's Official Cro-Mags website

Profile Records albums
1989 albums
Cro-Mags albums